John Jani Janardhan is a 1984 Hindi film directed by T. Rama Rao. Rajinikanth played the main lead in a triple role. John being the father and Johnny and Janardhan being the two sons. It is a remake of the 1982 Tamil film Moondru Mugam, which starred Rajinikanth and Raadhika.

Plot

Janardhan, one of two twin sons of the police inspector John A. Mendez, seeks to avenge his father's murder.

Cast
 Rajinikanth as Inspector John A. Mendes/Janardhan B. Gupta/Johny
 Thiagarajan as Gopaldas
 Rati Agnihotri as Madhu
 Chandrashekhar as Madhu's dad (as Chandrasekhar)
 Leena Das
 Poonam Dhillon as Cheryl J. Mendes
 Dulari as Fatimabi
 Utpal Dutt as Brijmohan Gupta
 Renu Joshi as Girja B. Gupta
 Kader Khan as Gajanand 'Gajju'
 Alka Nupur as Asha / Cheryl
 Vijay Kumar

Music
The film's music was composed by Laxmikant–Pyarelal and lyrics by Anand Bakshi.

References

External links
 

1984 films
1980s Hindi-language films
Hindi remakes of Tamil films
Films directed by T. Rama Rao
Films scored by Laxmikant–Pyarelal
Twins in Indian films